International All Sports Limited is an Australian-based gambling company, best known for its online gambling subsidiaries Canbet and IASBet, which it acquired in a merger in August 2004. Canbet is licensed and regulated by the UK Gambling Commission. IAS also runs Aus Tote, an Australian tote betting company and IAS Read Rating & OzeForm, both form analysis companies in India.

Canbet
In 2014 the directors announced that they were unable to pay clients and would, 'work with a business asset agent to liquidate assets from within Canbet and its associated companies'.

Canbet's problems with paying customers were first reported in the Gambling Times and SportsbookReview in October 2013.

Notes

External links
IAS Corporate Site
Online Casino Guide

Australian companies established in 1995
Gambling companies established in 1995
Online gambling companies of Australia
Horse racing in Australia
Companies based in Darwin, Northern Territory